Pactolinus is a genus of the Histeridae family of Beetles

Species
The genus contains the following species:

 Pactolinus arctus (Desbordes, 1914)  
 Pactolinus collai Vienna, 2005  
 Pactolinus fortis (Schmidt, 1889)  
 Pactolinus gigas (Paykull, 1811)  
 Pactolinus intrepidus (Lewis, 1897)  
 Pactolinus latilabris (Lewis 1911)  
 Pactolinus latipes (Palisot de Beauvois, 1805)  
 Pactolinus major (Linnaeus 1767)  
 Pactolinus maurus (Marseul, 1854)  
 Pactolinus robusticeps (Marseul, 1886)  
 Pactolinus robusticollis (Lewis, 1892)  
 Pactolinus saginatus (Lewis, 1899)  
 Pactolinus togoensis (Bickhardt, 1918)  
 Pactolinus transvaalensis Gomy, 2001

References

Histeridae